Ruth Hale Oliver (April 16, 1910 – October 3, 1988) was an American astrologer, astrology teacher, writer, and occasional actress.

She was born in Philadelphia to L. Stauffer Oliver, an attorney (born in New Jersey) and Margaret H. Scott (born in England). She was married to George Gercke in 1931 and divorced in 1940. She died on October 3, 1988 from natural causes at the age of 78. Oliver had one child, actress Susan Oliver.

Filmography

Ruth Hale Oliver bibliography
The Basic Principles of Astrology: A Modern View of an Ancient Science;  (1-4254-8604-5, softcover), Kessinger Publishing, 1962 (reprinted 2011) 
Astropsychiatry (co-author: Harry F. Darling), CSA Press, 1968 (1973 reprint); /.

External links
Profile, astrologersmemorial.org; accessed February 19, 2018.
 Ruth Hale Oliver memorial at Solstice Point website

External links

Writers from Philadelphia
American astrologers
20th-century astrologers
American columnists
1910 births
1988 deaths
20th-century American non-fiction writers
20th-century American women writers
American women non-fiction writers
American women columnists